Viškovci is a village and a municipality in Osijek-Baranja County, Croatia. There are 1,906 inhabitants in the municipality according to a 2011 census.

Name 
The name of the village in Croatian is plural.

References

Municipalities of Croatia